Phool (est. 1990) is a monthly magazine for children published by Nawa-i-Waqt group of publications owned by Majid Nizami Trust, from Lahore, Punjab, Pakistan. It is edited by Phool Shoaib Mirza.

In 2010, Pakistan Prime Minister [Yousuf Raza Gilani] congratulated Phool on the completion of 20 years of publication, saying "It is a matter of satisfaction that the magazine is playing an important role to impart educating to the young generation besides providing them entertaining." In 2008, International Islamic University Islamabad awarded Phool the "Best Children's Magazine" in a competition published in 'Tameer-e-Pakistan Number' organized by Dawah Academy and Department of Children Literature.

References

External links

 Phool's official website

1990 establishments in Pakistan
Magazines established in 1990
Children's magazines published in Pakistan
Monthly magazines published in Pakistan
Urdu-language magazines
Mass media in Lahore